Adrian Michael Dullard (12 January 1918 – 6 November 1989) was an Australian rules football player in the Victorian Football League (VFL). 

Dullard came under notice in 1938 with Rochester, when coached by Stewie Copeland and when he represented the Bendigo Football League in a match against Melbourne in 1938, kicking five goals.

Dullard played in Melbourne's Reserves' 1939 premiership team.

He was a member of the Melbourne premiership team in 1941 and 1948. He kicked the game-tying goal in time-on of the final quarter during the drawn 1948 VFL Grand Final, which set up the following week's replay which Melbourne won.

Dullard played in Melbourne's losing 1946 VFL Grand Final, where he kicked three goals.

Dullard spent 1944 in the Australian Army.

He became captain-coach of Williamstown in the VFA in 1950 and 1951, and then continued on as a player in 1952 and 1953. He was vice-captain in the latter season. He won the most consistent player award in 1952 and played a total of 82 games for the Seagulls, kicking 111 goals. His son, Tony Dullard, also played for Melbourne and Williamstown.

References

External links

Melbourne Football Club players
Williamstown Football Club players
Williamstown Football Club coaches
Australian rules footballers from Victoria (Australia)
Rochester Football Club players
1918 births
1989 deaths
Melbourne Football Club Premiership players
Two-time VFL/AFL Premiership players